Gug Tappeh-ye Laleh (also Romanized as Gūg Tappeh-ye Laleh; also known as Gūg Tappeh Lāh) is a village in Marhemetabad Rural District, in the Central District of Miandoab County, West Azerbaijan Province, Iran. At the 2006 census, its population was 332, in 83 families.

References 

Populated places in Miandoab County